Woodlawn may refer to:

Woodlawn (film), a 2015 film
St John's College, Woodlawn, a school in New South Wales, Australia

Populated places

Australia

 Woodlawn, Queensland, a neighbourhood in Moola, Western Downs region

Canada
Woodlawn, Nova Scotia, a neighbourhood of Dartmouth
Woodlawn, Ontario, a neighbourhood of Ottawa

Ireland
Woodlawn, County Galway

United States
 Woodlawn (Birmingham), a neighborhood in Birmingham, Alabama
 Woodlawn, Chicago, Illinois, a South Side neighborhood
 Woodlawn, Jefferson County, Illinois
 Woodlawn, Kansas
 Woodlawn, Kentucky
 Woodlawn, Baltimore County, Maryland  
 Woodlawn, Prince George's County, Maryland
 Woodlawn, Mississippi
 Woodlawn, Missouri, an unincorporated community
 Woodlawn, Bronx, a neighborhood in New York City
 Woodlawn, Erie County, New York, a hamlet
 Woodlawn, Schenectady, New York
 Woodlawn, North Carolina
 Woodlawn, Ohio
 Woodlawn, Portland, Oregon
Woodlawn, Pennsylvania, town which merged to form Aliquippa
 Woodlawn, Tennessee
 Woodlawn, Texas, in Harrison County
 Woodlawn, Virginia (disambiguation), multiple places
 Woodlawn, Wisconsin

Buildings and plantations:
 Woodlawn (Smyrna, Delaware), listed on the NRHP
 Woodlawn (Leon County), Florida, a historic plantation
 Woodlawn (Columbia, Maryland), listed on the NRHP
 Woodlawn (Ellicott City, Maryland), a historic house
 Woodlawn (St. Marys, Maryland), listed on the NRHP
 Woodlawn (Garrison, New York), listed on the NRHP
 Woodlawn (Nashville, Tennessee), listed on the NRHP
 Woodlawn (Austin, Texas), a historic estate
 Woodlawn (Alexandria, Virginia) Alexandria, Virginia, a historic estate operated by the National Trust for Historic Preservation
 Woodlawn (Miller's Tavern, Virginia), listed on the NRHP
 Woodlawn (Oilville, Virginia), listed on the NRHP
 Woodlawn (Vernon Hill, Virginia), listed on the NRHP
 Woodlawn (Kearneysville, West Virginia), listed on the NRHP

See also
Wood Lawn (disambiguation)
Woodlawn Cemetery (disambiguation)
Woodlawn Farm (disambiguation)
Woodlawn Historic District (disambiguation)
Woodlawn Station (disambiguation)
Woodlawn Jane Doe, an unidentified murder victim found in Woodlawn, Maryland
Woodland (disambiguation)